Fluminimaggiore (Frùmini Majori or Flùmini Majori in Sardinian language) is a comune (municipality) in the Province of South Sardinia in the Italian region Sardinia, located about  northwest of Cagliari and about  north of Carbonia.

Fluminimaggiore borders the following municipalities: Arbus, Buggerru, Domusnovas, Gonnosfanadiga, Iglesias.

The Temple of Antas is located in the Fluminimaggiore territory. There are several museums in the town, including a paleontology museum.

References

Cities and towns in Sardinia